Dahaka has several meanings:

 Zahhak (Aži Dahāka), a dragon-king in Zoroastrian Persian mythology
 The Dahaka, an enemy in the Prince of Persia: Warrior Within video game.
Dahaka, a boss in Final Fantasy XIII
Azi Dahaka, a boss in Final Fantasy XI
Dehaka, a primal zerg in StarCraft II: Heart of the Swarm
Azhi Dehaaka, a void beast in Under Night In-Birth